Preston Deanery is a hamlet in the civil parish of Hackleton in West Northamptonshire, England. It lies just off the B526 road (former A50) from Northampton to Newport Pagnell, between Hackleton and Wootton, a former village which has become now a suburb of Northampton.

The hamlet's name means 'Priests' farm/settlement'. The hamlet gave its name to the deanery here.

Governance
The village is represented on Hackleton parish council which also covers the nearby villages of Piddington and Horton. It is an "ancient parish"; a village or group of villages or hamlets and the adjacent lands which originally they held ecclesiastical functions, but from the 16th century onwards they also acquired civil roles. It was abolished as a separate parish in 1935. The 1801 census showed a population of 70. The current population estimate is 51. At the 2011 Census the population remained less than 100 and was included in the civil parish of Hackleton.

Buildings

Church

The church was dedicated to St Peter circa 1200, then St Peter and St Paul c.1415. It was a parish church for what was at the time a much larger and later abandoned village. The church is now redundant but cared for by the Churches Conservation Trust. It has a 12th-century west tower with a central pilaster-buttress on each face, a single nave, and a square-ended chancel. A small part of the church is early Norman (11th century) and an even earlier part appears to have an early Viking influence, which is very unusual for the area. The chancel arch is Romanesque.

Preston Deanery Hall and other houses

Around 1940 Preston Deanery consisted of four semi-detached properties, half a dozen farms and Preston Deanery Hall, once inhabited by monks but since converted to a private residence. During the Second World War one of the houses was occupied by a boy and his mother, who worked as a domestic servant at the Hall. The boy went to school in Hackleton. His experiences are described on the BBC People's War website.

Preston Green

Further urban expansion of Northampton was being planned in October 2008 with another 13,500 houses and additional infrastructure in the rural areas around Grange Park, Quinton and Preston Deanery however the incoming Conservative-LibDem coalition government of the 2010 General Election has abolished this expansion proposal.

References

External links

Villages in Northamptonshire
Hackleton